K. Parthasarathy (born 9 December 1943) is an Indian former cricket umpire. He stood in two Test matches between 1994 and 1998 and ten ODI games between 1993 and 2002.

See also
List of Test cricket umpires
List of One Day International cricket umpires

References

1943 births
Living people
Place of birth missing (living people)
Indian Test cricket umpires
Indian One Day International cricket umpires